Sins of the Father is a 2002 American crime drama television film directed by Robert Dornhelm and written by John Pielmeier. It is based on an article by Pamela Colloff published in the April 2000 issue of Texas Monthly, chronicling the 1963 16th Street Baptist Church bombing in Birmingham, Alabama, in which four young African-American girls were killed while attending Sunday school.  The victims were Addie Mae Collins, 14 yrs old; Denise McNair, 11 yrs old; Carole Robertson, 14 yrs old; and Cynthia Welsley, 14 yrs old. It was believed that there were 5 girls together in the church basement on that fateful day, but only one survived: young Sarah Collins, Addie Mae's younger sister. The bombing was racially motivated and carried out by members of the Ku Klux Klan. The film was first aired on January 6, 2002 on FX.

Plot
Tom Cherry (Tom Sizemore), a middle-aged man, has difficult decisions to make when the police reopen the investigation into the 1963 16th Street Baptist Church bombing in Birmingham, Alabama in which his father, Bobby Frank Cherry (Richard Jenkins), was involved. Now, Tom has to decide whether to protect his father or to turn him in and let justice finally be done.

Cast 
 Tom Sizemore as Tom Cherry
 Richard Jenkins as Bobby Frank Cherry
 Brenda Bazinet as Virginia Cherry
 Lachlan Murdoch as Young Tom
 Colm Feore as Dalton Strong
 Ving Rhames as Garrick Jones
 Jessica Gray Charles as Denise McNair
 Funmiola Lawson as Cynthia Wesley
 Aaryn Doyle as Carole Robertson
 Isys McKoy as Addie Mae Collins
 Mica Le John as Sarah Collins
 Kim Roberts as Mrs. Wesley
 Delores Etienne as Older Woman at Church
 Sandi Ross as Sunday School Teacher
 Ardon Bess as Minister at Church
 Michael Rhoades as Tommy
 Bruce McFee as Robert Chambliss
 Tony Munch as Herman Cash
 Simon Reynolds as Troy Ingram
 Tom McBeath as J. Edgar Hoover

Production
The film was shot in Toronto. The cast includes Tom Sizemore, Richard Jenkins, Ving Rhames, Colm Feore, Jackie Richardson, Connor Price, Aaryn Doyle, Isys McKoy, Jessica Gray Charles, and Funmiola Lawson.

Reception

Critical response
On Rotten Tomatoes, the film has an approval rating of 50% based on reviews from 6 critics.

Andy Webb from "The Movie Scene" gave the film four out five stars and wrote: "What this all boils down to is that "Sins of the Father" is an extremely powerful movie which doesn't hold back when it comes to showing the racism of the 1960s and then building a modern drama around it with a son's conflict. It will be too brutal for some but it is worth it as it will shock and move you whilst also showing a trio of actors playing difficult roles extremely well."

Accolades
Rhames was nominated for the Black Reel Award for Best Actor and the NAACP Image Award for Outstanding Actor in a Television Movie, Mini-Series or Dramatic Special. Pielmeier's teleplay earned him nominations for the Humanitas Prize and the Writers Guild of America Award.
Sins of the Father was also nominated for an Artios Awards in the category of "Best Casting for TV Movie of the Week". The film was also nominated for a NAACP Image Awards for "Outstanding Actress in a Television Movie, Mini-Series or Dramatic Special".

See also
 Civil rights movement in popular culture

References

External links
 
 

2002 television films
2002 films
2002 crime drama films
2000s American films
2000s English-language films
American crime drama films
American drama television films
American films based on actual events
Artisan Entertainment films
Civil rights movement in film
Civil rights movement in television
Crime films based on actual events
Crime television films
Drama films based on actual events
Films about father–son relationships
Films about the Ku Klux Klan
Films based on newspaper and magazine articles
Films directed by Robert Dornhelm
Films scored by Harald Kloser
Films set in Alabama
Films shot in Toronto
FX Networks original films
History of Birmingham, Alabama
Television films based on actual events